, also known in English as Monster #8, is a Japanese manga series written and illustrated by Naoya Matsumoto. It has been serialized for free on Shueisha's Shōnen Jump+ application and website since July 2020, with its chapters collected in nine tankōbon volumes as of March 2023. The story follows Kafka Hibino, a man who, after a freak accident, gains the ability to turn into a kaiju and now must navigate using his power while trying to become part of an organization that eliminates kaiju to fulfill a promise he made with a childhood friend.

Viz Media has licensed the series for English release in North America. An anime television series adaptation by Production I.G is set to premiere in 2024. By March 2023, the manga had over 11 million copies in circulation. The series has been praised for its premise, characters and art.

Synopsis

Setting
Kaiju no. 8 is set in a world in which monsters named kaiju regularly cause disasters. Japan is considered to be the country with the highest rate of kaiju attacks in the world. In order to combat the kaiju, Japan established the Defense Force, a military organization tasked with eliminating them. Kaiju are assigned a “fortitude level” – a scale indicating their overall strength, and are classified as honju (“main beasts”) – more dangerous, stronger kaiju and yoju (“residual beasts”) – smaller kaiju that can accompany or sprout off from the honju. If a kaiju has a higher fortitude level and/or possesses abnormal characteristics it is classified as a daikaiju, which are considered to be extremely powerful and dangerous, and are given a number as an identifier based on when they first appeared. Officers in the Defense Force wear power suits made from kaiju remains which grant them increased strength, speed and durability. These suits also have a power output measured in the form of a percentage (referred to as "unleashed combat power"). The Defense Force is made up of general officers and platoon leaders, with varying levels of unleashed combat power, and captains and vice-captains whose combat power exceeds 90% and who lead divisions. Daikaiju remains are used to create stronger weapons named Numbers that some individuals can use if they are deemed compatible and which are named after the daikaiju they are made from.

Plot
After their town was destroyed by kaiju when they were children, friends Kafka Hibino and Mina Ashiro both vowed to become members of the Defense Force. Mina has since become the captain of the Defense Force's Third Division while Kafka has failed the examination numerous times and is now a member of a clean-up crew that dispose of the kaiju after battle. Kafka meets a young part-time worker in his company, Reno Ichikawa, an aspiring Defense Force member, who reignites his desire to become part of the Defense Force. However, a small kaiju enters Kafka's body through his mouth and he gains the ability to turn into a kaiju. Kafka escapes the Defense Force and is given the codename "Kaiju no. 8." He decides to apply while keeping his form a secret.

Kafka and Reno are able to pass the examination and are inducted into the Third Division together with Kikoru Shinomiya, a kaiju-slaying prodigy, who finds out about Kafka's condition after he saves her from a humanoid kaiju, later named "Kaiju No. 9", who becomes their primary adversary. After fighting off two kaiju attacks orchestrated by No. 9, Kafka reveals his kaiju form when he transforms to save the Third Division base from being destroyed and is, reluctantly, apprehended by Mina and taken into custody. He is then tested in battle by the Director General of the Defense Force, Isao Shinomiya, who uses the Numbers 2 weapon made from the remains of Kaiju no. 2. Kafka proves that he can control himself while transformed, is spared from being disposed of and is transferred, with Kikoru, to the First Division to work under captain Gen Narumi. During an operation to prevent an attack planned by No. 9 Kafka, Kikoru and Gen succeed in defeating two versions of No. 9 which are revealed to be decoys. The real one attacks Isao and absorbs him and his Numbers 2 weapon after which No. 9 becomes stronger, escapes from the Defense Force and prepares an invasion of Japan several months later with new daikaiju.

Media

Manga
Kaiju No. 8 is written and illustrated by Naoya Matsumoto. The series began on Shueisha's Shōnen Jump+ application and website on July 3, 2020. In August 2020, Matsumoto and Kaiju No. 8 adopted a schedule where a new chapter is published every week for three weeks, followed by a one week break. On June 25, 2021 a new schedule was adopted where a new chapter is published every two weeks. Shueisha has collected its chapters into individual tankōbon volumes. The first volume was released on December 4, 2020. A promotional video, presented as a news program, was shown on the big screen of Yunika Vision at Seibu-Shinjuku Station from December 4–10, 2020. As of March 3, 2023, nine volumes have been released.

The series is simultaneously published in English by Shueisha on their Manga Plus website and application as it is published in Japan, under the title Monster #8. It is also simultaneously published in English by Viz Media under the title Kaiju No. 8. In February 2021, Viz Media announced that they would publish the first volume of Kaiju No. 8 in fall 2021.

Volume list

Chapters not yet in tankōbon format
These chapters have yet to be published in a tankōbon volume. They were serialized on Shōnen Jump+.
 Chapter: 74–82

Light novel
A 4-chapter side story light novel, written by Keiji Ando and illustrated by the original manga author, Naoya Matsumoto, was released on November 4, 2022.

Anime
On August 4, 2022, it was announced that the manga would be receiving an anime adaptation. It was later revealed to be a television series set to premiere in 2024, with Production I.G animating and Studio Khara supervising the kaiju designs and artworks.

Reception

Popularity
According to Yūta Momiyama, the deputy editor-in-chief of Shōnen Jump+, Kaiju No. 8, along with Spy × Family, have been very popular and are doing especially well on the Manga Plus service. In December 2020, it was reported that Kaiju No. 8 surpassed 30 million views, making it the fastest Shōnen Jump+ series to achieve this feat, and each new chapter published surpasses one million views. In February 2021, the series reached 70 million views. In April 2021, the series reached over 100 million views. In February 2023, the series reached 400 million views. The series ranked #10 on AnimeJapan's 5th "Most Wanted Anime Adaptation" poll in 2022.

Manga
The School Library Journal listed the first volume of Kaiju No. 8 as one of the top 10 manga of 2021. It ranked 3rd on Takarajimasha's Kono Manga ga Sugoi! 2022 list of best manga for male readers. The series ranked 2nd on the Nationwide Bookstore Employees' Recommended Comics of 2022. The series was included in Polygon's list of the best comics of 2021.

Sales
The series' first volume sold 90,831 copies in its first week, and 69,404 copies in its second week. By December 2020, the first volumes had over 430,000 copies in circulation (print and digital). In January 2021, it was reported that the series the best-selling new manga of 2020, within only 28 days since the first volume was published. By March 2021, the manga had over 1 million copies printed physically and 200,000 copies sold digitally, making it the fastest Shōnen Jump+ series to reach 1 million copies in circulation, and 20 days later reached 1.5 million copies in circulation. By June 2021, the manga had 2.5 million copies in circulation, and by middle of the month it reached 3 million copies. By September 2021, the manga had over 4 million copies in circulation; over 5.5 million copies in circulation by December 2021; over 6.7 million copies in circulation by March 2022; over 7.8 million copies in circulation by July 2022; over 8 million copies in circulation by August 2022; over 10 million copies in circulation by December 2022; and over 11 million copies in circulation by March 2023.

Individual volumes have ranked on The New York Times Graphic Books and Manga bestseller monthly list since 2022.

In France, the series sold 22,041 copies in its first week, making it the best-selling debut of manga in France. In Italy, the first volume had a first print run of 245,000 copies (including various editions), surpassing Demon Slayer: Kimetsu no Yaiba, which has 200,000 copies in circulation per volume.

Critical reception
In a positive review of the first five chapters, Antonio Mireles of The Fandom Post wrote that Kaiju No. 8 has an engaging premise and a "ton of engrossing aspects that it can play with." Although metamorphosis is a plot device that is seen often, he felt that the character Kafka "adds new life" to the trope. However, Mireles said it was "such a shame" that the story moved on from Monster Sweeper Inc to the Defense Force, as the former could have been a source for captivating stories. He believes that Kafka Hibino and his name are meant to draw comparisons to Franz Kafka's story The Metamorphosis. Although referring to Kikoru Shinomiya as the "typical spoiled, prodigy girl," Mireles called her an exciting rival for Kafka. He strongly praised Matsumoto's kaiju designs and the art as "beautiful and grotesque but in a good way," but did not like how the monsters' intestines are self-censored by the author. Grant Jones of Anime News Network praised the series, highlighting its premise, characters, art work and its comedy. Jones concluded: "Honestly, this one has a lot of promise and I'm eager to see what else is in store." Danica Davidson of Otaku USA, in a review of the first volume of the manga,  praised the series' unique premise within the kaiju genre and its comedic tone saying that "it's regularly very funny, and its characters are unique and likable."

In a mixed review of the first volume, Dallas Marshall of Comic Book Resources praised the series' subversion of genre tropes by having an older protagonist and because of its focus on the aftermath of battles. He commended the "brisk pacing" which he described as "a double-edged sword" since it allows for faster action but sacrifices character development. He criticized the art writing that "the artwork of Kaiju No. 8 flip-flops between passable and outstanding" and that "it lacks the consistency of similar shonen work." He ended his review by writing that the series "is still a little wet behind the ears, but it has the potential to become something great."

Awards and nominations

References

Further reading

External links
 

 

Adventure anime and manga
Anime series based on manga
Fiction about shapeshifting
Japanese webcomics
Jump J-Books
Kaiju
Production I.G
Science fantasy anime and manga
Shōnen manga
Shueisha manga
Toho Animation
Upcoming anime television series
Viz Media manga
Webcomics in print